Wisques is a commune in the Pas-de-Calais department in the Hauts-de-France region of France.

Geography
Wisques is located 4 miles (6 km) southwest of Saint-Omer, at the D212 and D208E road junction.

Population

Places of interest
 Two chapels, dating from the twentieth century.
 A small 18th-century château in Louis XV style.
 The Grand Château : dating from the fourteenth century.
 The Benedictine Abbey of St. Paul

See also
Communes of the Pas-de-Calais department

References

External links

  Abbey of St. Paul, Wisques 

Communes of Pas-de-Calais